WTHB (1550 AM) and WTHB-FM (96.9 FM), are Christian radio stations simulcasting an urban gospel format, serving the Augusta metropolitan area and owned by Perry Publishing and Broadcasting.  The FM station is licensed to Wrens, Georgia, and the AM station is licensed to Augusta, Georgia. The studios and the AM transmitter are co-located on Broadcast Drive at Radio Station Road in North Augusta, South Carolina.  Both stations carry the nationally syndicated morning gospel show hosted by Erica Campbell and an afternoon talk radio show hosted by Al Sharpton.

WTHB-FM has an effective radiated power (ERP) of 6,200 watts.  Its transmitter off U.S. Route 1 at County Road 32 in Matthews, Georgia.  By day, WTHB (AM) is powered at 5,000 watts.  But AM 1550 is a clear channel frequency reserved for CBEF Windsor, Ontario, Canada.  So at night, WTHB (AM) greatly drops its power to 11 watts to avoid interference.  It uses a non-directional antenna.

History
96.9 signed on as WYFA in 1988 as an outlet for the Bible Broadcasting Network. It was sold, becoming WAEW in 1993 and WAEJ in 1994 (The latter as a simulcast of UC formatted WAEG as "The New 92.3 and 100.9 The Beat").

Radio One acquired the station(s) in 2001 and flipped to a mostly-automated CHR format while still using "The Beat" branding. By 2002, the simulcast with 92.3 was dropped and 100.9 switched to Urban Gospel under the WTHB call sign.

In August 2007, Radio One sold its Augusta stations (including WTHB) to Perry Broadcasting.  On January 11, 2008, the station switched frequencies with sister WAKB and moved to 96.9 FM, a weaker signal.  To boost its coverage, it simulcasts with WTHB 1550 AM.

WTHB 1550 AM originally signed on the air in May 1960.  For nearly all its history, it has broadcast to Augusta's African American community.

See also

Media in Augusta, Georgia

References

External links
PRAISE 96.9 — official website

Radio stations established in 1988
Gospel radio stations in the United States
THB